Kamia Brown (born October 24, 1980) is an American politician who served as a member of the Florida House of Representatives for the 45th district from 2016 to 2022. Brown was an unsuccessful candidate for the Florida Senate in 2022.

References

1980 births
Living people
People from Orlando, Florida
Women state legislators in Florida
Democratic Party members of the Florida House of Representatives
21st-century American politicians
21st-century American women politicians